Bar Yosef, verb. "Joseph's son", is an Israeli surname.

 Yosef Bar-Yosef, playwright
 Ofer Bar-Yosef, archaeologist